Jean-Jacques Aeschlimann (born 30 May 1967) is a retired Swiss ice hockey player.  He played for several teams in the National League A (NLA), including EHC Biel, HC Lugano, HC Fribourg-Gottéron and Lausanne HC.  He also played for the Switzerland men's national ice hockey team on several occasions.

Career statistics

Regular season and playoffs

International

External links

Statistics at Eurohockey.net

1967 births
HC Lugano players
Living people
EHC Biel players
HC Fribourg-Gottéron players
Lausanne HC players
Swiss ice hockey centres
Olympic ice hockey players of Switzerland
Ice hockey players at the 2002 Winter Olympics
People from Biel/Bienne
Sportspeople from the canton of Bern